Batesiella is a monotypic genus of African tarantulas containing the single species, Batesiella crinita. It was first described by Reginald Innes Pocock in 1903, and is found in Cameroon. It is named in honor of the collector, G. L. Bates. It was synonymized with Encyocrates from 1985 to 1990.

See also
 List of Theraphosidae species

References

Endemic fauna of Cameroon
Monotypic Theraphosidae genera
Spiders of Africa
Taxa named by R. I. Pocock
Theraphosidae